Caterine Ibargüen Mena ODB (born 12 February 1984) is a retired Colombian athlete competing in high jump, long jump and triple jump. Her notable achievements include a gold medal at the 2016 Summer Olympics, silver medal in the 2012 Summer Olympics, two gold medals in the IAAF World Championships in Athletics, and two gold medals in the 2011 Pan American Games and 2015 Pan American Games.

Biography
Caterine was born in the Urabá region of Antioquia, where she was raised by her grandmother after her parents separated because of the armed conflict in Colombia. Her father left for Venezuela and her mother moved to Turbo, Colombia. Caterine first played volleyball and Wilder Zapata, her coach, noticed her skill and suggested she play in Medellín, which had the high-profile Atanasio Girardot Sports Complex as a venue for national and international games. There she began her training in 1996 with the Cuban coach Jorge Luis Alfaro, specializing in the high jump.

Her personal best in the high jump is 1.93 metres, achieved on 22 July 2005 in Cali. This is the current Colombian record. She competed at the 2004 Olympic Games in Athens, where jumped 1.85 m in the qualifying round. She held the South American record in the triple jump with 15.31 m from July 2014 until September 2019. That jump remained the best jump since the Olympics in August 2008 until Yulimar Rojas achieved a mark of 15.41 m at the Jaén Paraíso Interior Meeting. On 1 September 2011 obtained the bronze medal at the IAAF World Championships in Daegu with a 14.84 m performance. Based in Puerto Rico. Coached by Ubaldo Duany, former Cuban Long Jumper (8.32 m PB from 1986). On 5 August, she won a silver medal at the London 2012 Olympics in the triple jump competition with a 14.80 m jump on her last attempt. On 15 August 2013 she won IAAF World Championships in Moscow in the triple jump competition with a 14.85 m jump on her second attempt.

Caterine Ibargüen announced retirement in August 2021.

Personal bests
Outdoor
200 m: 24.96 s (wind: -1.2 m/s) – San Germán, 4 December 2009
800 m: 2:35.35 min – San Germán, 4 December 2010
100 m hurdles: 14.09 s (wind: +0.0 m/s) – Mayagüez, 19 February 2011
High jump: 1.93 m – Cali, 22 July 2005
Long jump: 6.93 m (wind: +0.8 m/s) – Ostrava, 9 September 2018
Triple jump: 15.31 m (wind: 0.0 m/s) – Monaco, 18 July 2014
Shot put: 13.79 m – Carolina, 20 March 2010
Javelin throw: 37.72 m – San Germán, 4 December 2010
Heptathlon: 5742 pts – San Germán, 5 December 2009

Indoor
High jump: 1.81 m –  Moscow, 11 March 2006

International competitions

Honours
:
 Grand Cross of the National Order of Merit (12 December 2018)

Awards
2018 IAAF Female athlete of the year award

References

External links

1984 births
Living people
People from Apartadó
Colombian female high jumpers
Colombian long jumpers
Colombian female triple jumpers
Female long jumpers
Female high jumpers
Olympic female triple jumpers
Olympic female high jumpers
Olympic athletes of Colombia
Olympic gold medalists for Colombia
Olympic silver medalists for Colombia
Olympic gold medalists in athletics (track and field)
Olympic silver medalists in athletics (track and field)
Athletes (track and field) at the 2004 Summer Olympics
Athletes (track and field) at the 2012 Summer Olympics
Athletes (track and field) at the 2016 Summer Olympics
Medalists at the 2012 Summer Olympics
Medalists at the 2016 Summer Olympics
Pan American Games gold medalists for Colombia
Pan American Games bronze medalists for Colombia
Pan American Games medalists in athletics (track and field)
Athletes (track and field) at the 2007 Pan American Games
Athletes (track and field) at the 2011 Pan American Games
Athletes (track and field) at the 2015 Pan American Games
Athletes (track and field) at the 2019 Pan American Games
World Athletics Championships athletes for Colombia
World Athletics Championships medalists
World Athletics Championships winners
South American Games silver medalists for Colombia
South American Games medalists in athletics
Central American and Caribbean Games gold medalists for Colombia
Competitors at the 2006 South American Games
Competitors at the 2002 Central American and Caribbean Games
Competitors at the 2006 Central American and Caribbean Games
Competitors at the 2010 Central American and Caribbean Games
Competitors at the 2014 Central American and Caribbean Games
Competitors at the 2018 Central American and Caribbean Games
Diamond League winners
IAAF Continental Cup winners
Central American and Caribbean Games medalists in athletics
Afro-Colombian women
Medalists at the 2011 Pan American Games
Medalists at the 2015 Pan American Games
Athletes (track and field) at the 2020 Summer Olympics
Sportspeople from Antioquia Department